Hyer is a surname. Notable people with the surname include:

Alex M. Hyer, 19th-century American politician
Bruce Hyer (born 1946), Canadian politician
David Hyer (1875–1942), American architect
Jacob Hyer (died 1838), American bare-knuckled boxer
Martha Hyer (1924–2014), American actress
Paul Hyer (born 1926), American academic
Robert Stewart Hyer (1860–1929), American educator and researcher
Tom Hyer (1819–1864), American bare-knuckle boxer

See also
Hyers, West Virginia
Hyers Sisters